= Tiny Urban Kitchen =

American food blog

Tiny Urban Kitchen is a blog founded by Jen Che which presents her original recipes and photographs, local restaurant reviews, travel guides, and personal anecdotes. Che is a resident of Cambridge, Massachusetts and a graduate of Massachusetts Institute of Technology. Before starting Tiny Urban Kitchen, Che worked as a research chemist, and now works as a patent lawyer.

In 2010, Tiny Urban Kitchen won the Project Food Blog contest run by Foodbuzz.com. In 2012, Tiny Urban Kitchen won a Saveur Best Food Blog award.
